Craig Headwaters Protected Area is a protected area located in the Stikine Region of British Columbia, Canada. It was established on January 25, 2001 to protect the Craig River Valley from the Alaskan border to its confluence with the Iskut River.

Ecology
The park protects a representative example of a Coastal Western Hemlock forest ecosystem. Giant specimens of Sitka spruce, up to 60 meters tall, are present. Uncommon plant communities are found near cool springs. The area also has some of the northernmost western red cedar in British Columbia.

See also
Lava Forks Provincial Park

References

Protected areas of British Columbia